Choeromorpha subfasciata is a species of beetle in the family Cerambycidae. It was described by Maurice Pic in 1922. It is known from Vietnam, Laos and Thailand.

References

Choeromorpha
Beetles described in 1922